Thomas Watters Brown, KC, PC, PC(NI) (17 March 1879 – 7 October 1944) was an Irish lawyer and politician.

Thomas Watters Brown was born at The Square in Newtownards, County Down on 17 March 1879 and was the son of James A. Brown, a wool draper, and Mary Anne Watters.

He was educated at Campbell College, Belfast and Queen's University Belfast. He was called to the Bar in 1907 and took silk in 1918.

He was elected Member of Parliament for North Down in 1918 and was appointed Solicitor-General for Ireland in June 1921. On 5 August of the same year, he was promoted to Attorney-General for Ireland. He was the last holder of both offices. He resigned as Attorney General for Ireland in December 1921, and served as a Judge of the High Court of Justice in Northern Ireland from 1922 until his death. He was appointed to the Privy Council of Northern Ireland in December 1922.

References

External links
 

1879 births
1944 deaths
UK MPs 1918–1922
Solicitors-General for Ireland
Attorneys-General for Ireland
Irish Queen's Counsel
Members of the Privy Council of Ireland
Members of the Privy Council of Northern Ireland
Members of the Parliament of the United Kingdom for County Down constituencies (1801–1922)
High Court judges of Northern Ireland
People educated at Campbell College
Alumni of Queen's University Belfast